Bibhutibhushan Datta (also Bibhuti Bhusan Datta; Bengali : বিভূতিভূষণ দত্ত, Bibhūtibhūṣaṇ Datta) (28 June 1888 – 6 October 1958) was a historian of Indian mathematics.

Datta came from a poor Bengali family. He was a student of Ganesh Prasad, studied at University of Calcutta and secured the master's degree in mathematics in 1914 and doctorate degree in 1920 in applied mathematics. He taught at Calcutta University where he was lecturer at University Science College, and during 1924–1929 he was  Rhashbehari Ghosh Professor of Applied Mathematics. During the 1920s and 1930s he created a reputation as an authority on the history of  Indian mathematics. He was also deeply interested in Indian philosophy and religion. In 1929 he retired from his professorship and left the university in 1933, and became a sannyasin (an ascetic, a person who has renounced worldly pleasures)  in 1938 under the name Swami Vidyaranya.

History of Hindu Mathematics: A Source Book, written by him jointly with Avadhesh Narayan Singh (1901–1954) became a standard reference in the history of Indian mathematics. He also wrote a monograph on the Shulba Sutras. He published more than 70 research papers mostly related to history of Indian mathematics.

In the  last years of his life, as Swami Vidyaranya, he lived mainly at Pushkar (in Rajasthan).

See also
 History of Hindu Mathematics: A Source Book

External links
 Biography

References

 
Historians of mathematics
Bengali mathematicians
1888 births
1958 deaths